Karatsan (Kaitag: Гъаӏрацӏан; Dargwa: ГъярацӀан) is a rural locality (a selo) and the administrative centre of Karatsansky Selsoviet, Kaytagsky District, Republic of Dagestan, Russia. The population was 1,162 as of 2010. There are 13 streets.

Geography 
Karatsan is located 10 km southeast of Madzhalis (the district's administrative centre) by road. Kartalay and Dzhinabi are the nearest rural localities.

Nationalities 
Dargins live there.

References 

Rural localities in Kaytagsky District